PAMP SA (Produits Artistiques Métaux Précieux) is an independently operated precious metals refining and fabricating company and member of the MKS Group. It was established in 1977 in Ticino, Switzerland

Originally starting as a minting facility of bars weighing less than 100 grams, and as an alloy specialist for the jewelry and luxury watch-making industries, it has grown to provide services from collection of doré from the mine, through to assaying, hedging and delivery of its bars and other products. The company produces bullion bars, from 1 gram to 12.5 kilograms.

PAMP also provides custom minting service for private companies and government mints. The company's product range in that field goes from small bars and medals to legal tender coins.

Accreditations

PAMP bars are acceptable as 'Good Delivery' by the Swiss National Bank, the London Bullion Market Association (LBMA), London Platinum and Palladium Market (LPPM), the Dubai Multi Commodity Center (DMCC), COMEX/NYMEX, Chicago Metals Exchange (CME), Tokyo Commodity Exchange (TOCOM), and the Shanghai Gold Exchange (SGE).

In support of the 'Good Delivery' system, the company is one of three 'Approved Good Delivery Referees' in the world designated by both the LBMA and the LPPM.

PAMP is the only refinery in Switzerland to simultaneously hold ISO 9001, ISO 14001, ISO 17025, OHSAS 18001 and SA8000 accreditations.

Since 2013, PAMP is a member of the Public-Private Alliance for Responsible Minerals Trade (PPA). The initiative aims to provide a fair-trade guarantee to make sure no materials extracted from conflict areas or human exploitation are being used. Members of the alliance include international corporations such as Apple, Microsoft, Panasonic, Boeing or Sony as well as government agencies and representatives from civil society. PAMP is supervised by the FINMA for compliance with Swiss Money Laundering Legislation.

MMTC-PAMP, joint venture of PAMP and MMTC Ltd, is also recognized by the LBMA as a Good Delivery Silver Refiner since 2013 and has been on the Good Delivery Gold List since 2014.

Services

Assay
The company employs sworn Federal assayers of precious metals, who work in accordance with the “Swiss Precious Metals Control Law” (LCMP). These assayers follow the instructions of the Central Office for Precious Metals Control in Bern (BCMP) and function independently of the hierarchical structure of the refinery. They determine the fineness and verify the conformity of the designated material coming from the melt.

Refining
PAMP S.A processes gold, silver and platinum group metals-bearing material. The current gold refining capacity exceeds 450-metric tons per year; current PGM refining capacity exceeds 30-metric tons per year. Methods include electrolysis, wet chemical chlorination (aqua regia), and wet chemical parting. All mine doré and scrap gold can be refined up to '999.9' (four-nines) purity, and as high as '999.99' (five-nines) purity, to meet specific industrial needs, such as electronic and fine jewelry manufacture. After refining, gold, platinum or palladium may also be delivered as client-specified alloys, or as metal sponge (powder) or salts (crystal and solution).

Bullion Bar Casting
The company manufactures a range of 'Good Delivery' gold bullion bars (usually 999.9 fine) ranging from 400 troy ounces to 50 gram. Silver 'Good Delivery' bars (usually 999.0 fine) range from 1000 ounces to 100 grams. Sizes and purities are matched to the special requirements of regional markets, manufacturers or end users.

Of the platinum group metals (platinum and palladium), PAMP manufactures 'Good Delivery' bars in one- to six-kilogram weights (usually 999.5 fine) through to 1 gram bars.

Bullion Coin Distribution
The MKS Group is an official distributor of the following legal tender bullion coins: South African Krugerrand, US Eagle, Canadian Maple Leaf, Chinese Panda, Australian Nugget, Austrian Philharmoniker, and Royal Mint Sovereign.

Minting
PAMP was the first refiner in the world to introduce a wide variety of decorative designs on the reverse side of its ingots, also known as 'small bars'. Today, the company accounts for more than half of the world market for gold bullion bars weighing less than 50-grams. The Lady Fortuna (Roman goddess of fortune) design is the first decorative motif to ever decorate precious metals bullion. The company also designs and produces commemorative coins and medals to mark historical or significant events. It produces, under license, proprietary collections for brands such as Sanrio's 'Hello Kitty', Iconic Brand Group's 'Peanuts' and international organizations such as UNESCO. It also supplies coin and medal blanks to leading government mints and banking institutions internationally. PAMP also manufactures minted gold bars that incorporate fashion, pop culture, nature derived motifs on their reverse sides.

PAMP's ingots and coins are sold widely around the world, even in such places as Harrods, which offers PAMP's minted products to its customers at its bank in its London flagship store.

Semi-Fabricated Products
The refinery produces a wide range of karat gold alloys for the fine watch and jewelry industries. Wires, plates, rods, strips and grains also serve a wide range of industries.

Financial Services
PAMP complements its physical precious metal offerings with specialized financial services of other MKS group companies. Such instruments include options, forwards, purity and location swaps as well as trading services.

PAMP has supplied precious metal materials to the Royal Canadian Mint.

Online Services
PAMP re-launched their online service Gold Avenue (Goldavenue SA) in 2018. Gold Avenue is the official online retailer of MKS PAMP GROUP. The service allows to buy, store, manage and sell precious metals (gold, silver, platinum and palladium) online, providing free storage (up to value of 10.000 CHF) and shipping within Europe.

MMTC-PAMP
Incorporated in India on 18 January 2008, MMTC-PAMP India Pvt. Ltd. is a joint venture between PAMP SA, Switzerland and MMTC Limited, a Government of India Undertaking. MMTC Limited is India's largest public sector trading organisation, engaged in the trading of several products including precious metals. It is India's single largest bullion trader.

The company operates a precious metals refinery and mint in Mewat, in the state of Haryana. With an investment of over Rs 2,200 million, MMTC PAMP has an annual refining capacity of 100 tons of gold, 600 tons of silver and mints 2.75 million pieces.

MMTC-PAMP India produces a wide range of products and has obtained the license for minting the Sovereign for The Royal Mint.

MMTC-PAMP has been awarded "Best Refinery" in 2013 and 2014 at the India International Bullion Summit in Mumbai.

References

External links 
Bullion Market Association, full members' list
Gold refineries - another Swiss money-spinner, BBC, 12 September 2012
MMTC-PAMP's website

Financial services companies of Switzerland
Manufacturing companies of Switzerland
Precious metals
Bullion dealers